Frank Claus Christian (28 April 1911 – 26 July 1988) was a Social Credit party member of the House of Commons of Canada. Born in Vancouver, British Columbia, he was a lawyer by career.

He was first elected at the Okanagan Boundary riding in the 1957 general election. As he completed his only term, the 23rd Canadian Parliament, Christian stated that he would not seek re-election in the 1958 election due to the need to spend six or seven months a year from his family while in Parliament.

Christian served for four years in municipal politics as a councillor and alderman of Penticton, British Columbia.

References

External links
 

1911 births
1988 deaths
British Columbia municipal councillors
Lawyers in British Columbia
Members of the House of Commons of Canada from British Columbia
Politicians from Vancouver
Social Credit Party of Canada MPs
20th-century Canadian lawyers